In China, at least since the middle of Tang dynasty, the phrase mulberry fields is a metonymy for the land which was or will be covered by oceans. This term is often used in Chinese literature and poetry, for example in Zuo Zhuan, which is about the death of Duke Jing of Jin and mentions the "Shaman of Mulberry Fields". Along with the "blue seas" phrase, since the Han dynasty, these two phrases were combined into an idiom that has meaning about changes and changing.

The mathematics book shushù jìyí 数术记遗 (shushù jìyí) by Xu Yue, from the Han dynasty, mentioned an idea about the turning of blue seas into mulberry fields. Yan Zhenqing, in his literature Magu Shan Xiantan Ji (痲姑山仙墰記), wrote that on the high tops of Mount Magu there could still be found clam and oyster shells, and he also mentioned the gardens and fields which once were under the water.

The blue sea turned into mulberry fields
"The blue sea turned into mulberry fields" (fig. "the transformations of the world") appears in the hagiographic works of Ge Hong, i.e., "Shenxian zhuan". The idiom is given in four characters, each having its own meaning: 沧 "blue, dark green; cold"; 海 "sea, ocean; maritime"; 桑 "mulberry tree; surname"; 田 "field, arable land, cultivated". This idiom can also be interpreted as "time will bring a great change into the world" or "everything will be change in time".

When the immortal Wang Yuan invited Magu to come to his house for a feast, after the food was being served, Magu said:

Wang drew a long breath and said:

Blue seas where once was mulberry fields
"Blue seas where once was mulberry fields" was written on the Records of the Grand Historian by Sima Qian. The idiom can be interpreted as "the time will bring great changing" or "the wheel of fate is spinning". Each characters of the idiom has a meaning: 渤 "swelling; the gulf of Hebei"; 澥 "gulf"; 桑 "mulberry tree; surname"; 田 "field, arable land, cultivated".

Literary works
A popular romance story from Korea tells of a beautiful peasant girl named Choon Hyang, who was proposed to by a noble young man named Yi Doryung. Wolmai, Choon Hyang's mother, agreed, as long as Yi Doryung was willing to give a marriage letter secretly to them and promise to never leave her daughter. Yi Doryung wrote this letter:

At the end of the Qing Dynasty, Prince Chun (1840–1891) lamented the destruction of Mingheyuan Garden (lit. "Singing Crane Garden") by Taiping Rebellion. He wrote a sentence: 
One of the most popular poems in Vietnam, the Tale of Kieu, has a line in the opening of the poem that refers to a great upheaval in the realm of humans. Vietnamese uses a native phrase bể dâu (shorting of bãi bể nương dâu) which is a calque of the Chinese term, 滄海桑田 cānghǎisāngtián. Bể meaning sea or ocean, while dâu meaning mulberries.

Culture
"The Sea and the Mulberry Field" is a title of an autobiography by Nguyễn Xuân Lan about her struggles to free herself and her family from the grip of the ruling party in Vietnam.

See also
 Flood Mythology of China

Notes

References

Chinese words and phrases
Locations in Chinese mythology
Floods in China
History of Imperial China